Traets is a Dutch surname. Notable people with the surname include:

Laura Traets (born 1998), Bulgarian rhythmic gymnast
Rachel Traets (born 1998), Dutch singer 

Dutch-language surnames